Step'anos V of Salmast, otherwise known as Stepanos V Salmastetsi (b. ? Salmas – d. 1567 Etchmiadzin), was Catholicos of All Armenians from 1547 to 1567.

Biography

Stepanos was born in Salmas in the Safavid Empire. In 1545, he was elected Catholicos. Two years later, in 1547, amidst the still ongoing and devastating Ottoman-Safavid War of 1532–1555, Stephen convened a secret meeting of which the result was to send a delegation headed by him to the Pope to plead for the liberation of Armenia. The group, which included Stepanos V, visited several European courts as well, including that of German Emperor Charles V.

Stepanos initiated talks with Rome for the Armenian Church become under the authority of the Catholic Church in exchange for Rome's support to Armenian emancipatory activities, but these efforts didn't lead to a unification.

References

Sources
 
 Gérard Dédéyan (ed.), Histoire du peuple arménien, Toulouse, Éd. Privat, 2007 (1re éd. 1982), pp. 339, 400, 460. . (in French)
 Joseph Fr. Michaud et Louis Gabriel Michaud, Biographie universelle, ancienne et moderne, Paris, 1825, Tome XIII p. 442. (in French)
 

1567 deaths
Catholicoi of Armenia
Persian Armenians
People from Salmas
16th-century people of Safavid Iran